Gossain Ghamandi Gir is the name of a Hindu Saivite monk of a Shankara lineage who is said to have founded a Saivite monastery in Bodhgaya in approximately 1590 CE.
The occupants of the monastery were of the Giri order, one of the ten Dashanami monastic orders founded by Shankara.
However, the Bodh Gaya Giri sect, for which the monastery was headquarters, "has had since its establishment no strong institutional or administrative links with any other ascetic organization".

According to the Encyclopedia of Monasticism,

Gossain Ghamandi Gir is reported to have been the first mahanth (abbot) of the monastery. The following succession of abbots for the monastery through the 1890s was listed in 1893 by Grierson:

According to Trevitich,

References

Hindu monks
Hindu monasteries in India